Abel Aferworki (born 13 May 1983) is an Eritrean footballer. He played as a midfielder for Eritrea national football team.

International career
Aferworki has been a regular for the Eritrean national side virtually since inception, and has featured in the 2008 African Nations Cup qualifiers, arguably their most successful campaign to date.

External links
 
 

1983 births
Living people
Eritrean footballers
Eritrea international footballers
Association football midfielders
Red Sea FC players
Eritrean Premier League players